Forni di Sotto is a comune (municipality) in the Province of Udine in the Italian region Friuli-Venezia Giulia, located about  northwest of Trieste and about  northwest of Udine.

Forni di Sotto borders the following municipalities: Ampezzo, Claut, Forni di Sopra, Sauris, Socchieve, Tramonti di Sopra.

Demographic evolution

References

External links
 www.comune.fornidisotto.ud.it

Cities and towns in Friuli-Venezia Giulia